Robert Lock may refer to:

 Robert Lock (British Army officer) (1879–1957), British general in the Royal Artillery
 Robert Heath Lock (1879–1915), English botanist
 Bob Lock (born 1949), Welsh writer
 Rob Lock (born 1966), basketball player
 Robert Lock (ski jumper), British Ski Jumper; see List of national ski-jumping records
 Robert Lock, co-defendant with Sandra Gregory in a 1993 Thai drugs case
 Robert Lock, of Lock, Hulme & Co.

See also

Robert Locke (disambiguation)